Luis Sandoval (born 15 July 1962) is a Panamanian wrestler. He competed in the men's Greco-Roman 100 kg at the 1992 Summer Olympics.

References

1962 births
Living people
Panamanian male sport wrestlers
Olympic wrestlers of Panama
Wrestlers at the 1992 Summer Olympics
Place of birth missing (living people)